Cempaka Putih is a district of Central Jakarta, Indonesia. Cempaka Putih is roughly bounded by Jenderal Ahmad Yani bypass highway to the east, Pramuka boulevard to the south, Letjend Suprapto boulevard to the north, and a railway line to the west. The name "Cempaka Putih" derived from flowering plant white champaca.

The office of Cempaka Putih is located in Jalan Rawa Kerbau III, Rawasari, Kelurahan Cempaka Putih Barat
Kecamatan Cempaka Putih, Jakarta Pusat (10520).

History
Cempaka Putih district was formerly part of Senen district, later broken up in 1969 into Cempaka Putih district and Senen district. At first, Cempaka Putih district consisted of seven Administrative Village: Cempaka Putih Timur, Cempaka Putih Barat, Galur, Tanah Tinggi, Kampung Rawa, Johar Baru, and Rawasari. In 1993, the Administrative Village of Galur, Tanah Tinggi, Kampung Rawa, and Johar Baru was separated to form the district of Johar Baru ("New Johar").

The Administrative Village of Cempaka Putih Barat was the first area to be developed in Cempaka Putih district. In 1952, 30 hectares of land in Rawasari were allocated for housing, this area roughly correspond to the present Cempaka Putih Barat Administrative Village. By 1960, the housing neighborhood had emerged, roughly at the same time with the development of Tanah Tinggi housing neighborhood.

Kelurahan (administrative village)
The district of Cempaka Putih is divided into three administrative villages (kelurahan):
Cempaka Putih Timur ("East Cempaka Putih") – area code 10510
Cempaka Putih Barat ("West Cempaka Putih") – area code 10520
Rawasari – area code 10570

Areas
Most parts of Cempaka Putih district are residential area. Mostly are high density urban kampung, yet some areas in Taman Solo area around Cempaka Putih Raya street are consist of well-planned upscale housings.

Certain parts facing major roads such as Pramuka, Ahmad Yani, and Letjend Suprapto streets are recognized as business and office areas. There are also certain street unofficially recognized as distinctive business area, such as Cempaka Putih Raya street that originally are residential area, now turned into row of restaurants, clothing stores and supermarket area, while Rawasari Selatan Raya all the way to Percetakan Negara Street are flanked  with rows of tiles, ceramics and building materials stores.

List of important places
Islamic Hospital Jakarta
Pertamina Jaya Hospital
Trisakti University F Campus
Jayabaya University B Campus
YARSI University
Salemba Prison
Arcici Sport Center

Main hotels
Hotels include the Cempaka; Patra Jasa; Sentral Hotel Jakarta and other accommodation such as the Green Pramuka Apartement.

References

Bibliography

 
Districts of Jakarta